Jan Kazimierz Umiastowski (died 1659) was a Polish szlachcic from family - comites Pierzchała-Umiastowski.

He was District Writer of Brześć since 1648, District Judge and Podkomorzy (Chamberlain) of Brześć; since 1654.

Marshal of the Sejm (nadzwyczajnego) on May 19, - June 20, 1655 in Warsaw.

Year of birth unknown
1659 deaths
17th-century Polish nobility
Jan Kazimierz